Radical 9 or radical man meaning "person" is a Kangxi radical. Of the 214 radicals, Radical 9 is one of 23 which are composed of 2 strokes.

When appearing at the left side of a Chinese character, it usually transforms into .

In the Kangxi Dictionary, there are 794 characters (out of 49,030) to be found under this radical.

 is also the 12th indexing component in the Table of Indexing Chinese Character Components predominantly adopted by Simplified Chinese dictionaries published in mainland China.

Evolution

Derived characters

Literature 

Leyi Li: “Tracing the Roots of Chinese Characters: 500 Cases”. Beijing 1993,

External links

Unihan Database - U+4EBA

009
012